George Beetham, F.R.G.S., M.H.R. (1840 – 20 August 1915), known to Māori as Hori Pitama, was a New Zealand politician and alpinist.

Beetham was born in 1840 in Horncastle, Lincolnshire, England. His father was the noted portrait painter William Beetham. The Beetham family emigrated to New Zealand in 1855, arriving on the William and Jane in 1855. Together with his brothers, he settled in the Wairarapa. As the land had originally been owned by Māori, Beetham engaged with them frequently and they knew him as Hori Pitama. His sister Susannah married Cecil Fitzroy in 1878.

Beetham made his first exploration of Mount Ruapehu in March 1878. In 1879, Beetham, accompanied by Joseph Prime Maxwell, a civil engineer of Wellington, made a complete ascent of Mount Ruapehu, and, reaching its summit, crossed the large southern glacier, and made a close examination of the hot lake that is in the great ice plateau, the existence of which had not been previously recorded.

Beetham represented the Wairarapa West electorate on the Wellington Provincial Council from February 1873 until the abolition of provincial government in October 1876. He represented the Wairarapa electorate in Parliament, after winning the 1877 by-election, to 1881. For a time, he was in Parliament at the same time as Fitzroy, his brother-in-law.

Beetham moved to London in 1898, and he died there on 20 August 1915.

Notes

References

New Zealand MPs for North Island electorates
New Zealand mountain climbers
New Zealand explorers
1840 births
1915 deaths
Members of the New Zealand House of Representatives
Explorers of New Zealand
Members of the Wellington Provincial Council
Unsuccessful candidates in the 1890 New Zealand general election
19th-century New Zealand politicians
British emigrants to New Zealand